Kansas's 39th Senate district is one of 40 districts in the Kansas Senate. It has been represented by Republican John Doll since 2017, following his defeat of incumbent Larry Powell in the 2016 Republican primary.

Geography
District 39 is based in Garden City and surrounding areas in the southwestern corner of the state, covering all of Finney, Grant, Greeley, Hamilton, Haskell, Kearny, Morton, Stanton, Stevens, and Wichita Counties. Other communities in the district include Ulysses, Hugoton, Elkhart, Lakin, Holcomb, Syracuse, Sublette, Leoti, and Johnson City.

The district is located entirely within Kansas's 1st congressional district, and overlaps with the 115th, 117th, 118th, 122nd, 123rd, and 124th districts of the Kansas House of Representatives. It borders the states of Oklahoma and Colorado.

Recent election results

2020

2016

2012

Federal and statewide results in District 39

References

39
Finney County, Kansas
Grant County, Kansas
Greeley County, Kansas
Hamilton County, Kansas
Haskell County, Kansas
Kearny County, Kansas
Morton County, Kansas
Stanton County, Kansas
Stevens County, Kansas
Wichita County, Kansas